Demicryptochironomus is a genus of European non-biting midges in the subfamily Chironominae of the bloodworm family Chironomidae.

Species
D. cuneatus (Townes, 1945)
D. fastigatus (Townes, 1945)
D. latior Reiss, 1988
D. neglectus Reiss, 1988
D. vulneratus (Zetterstedt, 1838)

References

Chironomidae
Culicomorpha genera